The 2018 CONIFA World Football Cup qualification was the process to decide a number of the teams that will play in the 2018 CONIFA World Football Cup. This is the second tournament to feature a qualification process, following on from the 2016 qualification. The first qualification match played was on 13 March 2016 between the Tamil Eelam team and the team representing the Romani people, with the first goal scored by Tamil Eelam's Panushanth Kulenthiran.

Background
The Confederation of Independent Football Associations (CONIFA) was founded in June 2013, as an organisation to represent football associations that are not eligible or choose not to join FIFA. One year later, it held its first official tournament, the 2014 ConIFA World Football Cup, in Sweden, to which the twelve participating teams were invited. The success of this tournament led to the decision to make it a biannual competition, with continental tournaments taking place in between, the first of which was the 2015 ConIFA European Football Cup.

ConIFA published a set of qualification criteria for the World Football Cup ahead of its 2017 Annual General Meeting, setting out the various methods in which teams could qualify for the WFC. This was subsequently revised into an official version for publication in June 2017.
Host – Barawa
World Football Cup Holder – Abkhazia
Wild Card – CONIFA's Executive Committee were required to give a Wild Card place to a team that has not yet qualified for the WFC no later than 9 months prior to the start of the tournament - this was given to Western Armenia. The Committee also had the right to issue a second Wild Card if approved by CONIFA's Annual General Meeting, which occurred and was given to Tibet.
Qualification tournament – Any member of CONIFA had the right to request that a tournament it hosts be sanctioned as a qualifier, providing it is held between 1 January of the year of the previous WFC, and 31 December of the year before the next WFC, and consists of at least four CONIFA members. The request to have the tournament sanctioned as a qualifier must be submitted at least two months prior to the start, and must be approved by CONIFA's Executive Committee. Three such tournaments were held, the ConIFA Challenger Cup, the Hungary Heritage Cup and the World Unity Cup 2016.
Continental tournament – If a ConIFA continental championship is held after the previous WFC, then a number of its participants qualify for the WFC; the total qualifiers is worked out by the number of participants in the tournament divided by 4. Only one such tournament was held, the ConIFA European Football Cup 2017 at which both the winner and runner-up qualified.
Qualification points – The remaining places (which numbered 8) were distributed according to the final positions in the various CONIFA continental rankings according to their accumulated ranking points, distributed by a system which rewarded playing matches against both CONIFA and other opponents. Where two or more teams from the same continental zone had the same number of qualification points, qualification was be determined by the CONIFA World Rankings.

CONIFA is split into six continental zones, with the total number of places in the World Football Cup based on the number of CONIFA members from each zone.

[a]: There were no South American members of ConIFA at the time of the tournament
The first qualifying process was undertaken for the 2016 ConIFA World Football Cup, which saw a series of friendly matches and tournaments, together with the 2015 ConIFA European Football Cup, designated as qualifiers for the 2016 WFC. However, this decision was taken at a late stage prior to the start of the European Football Cup tournament, only a year prior to the planned start of the 2016 WFC in Abkhazia. As a consequence, for its 2018 WFC tournament, ConIFA began designating planned friendly matches as qualifiers from the beginning of 2016, allowing a greater time for those teams achieving qualification to plan for the tournament. The first of these was the ConIFA Challenger Cup, held in Remscheid on 12 and 13 March 2016.

Qualified teams

Qualification

ConIFA Challenger Cup
The ConIFA Challenger Cup was a two team competition held over two days. The two participants, Tamil Eelam and Romani people, each played a 45-minute match against a local select side from the town of Remscheid, where the tournament was being held, on the first day, before playing off against each other on the second.

Hungary Heritage Cup
The Hungary Heritage Cup was a four-team competition held at the beginning of August 2016 in Szarvas, celebrating the heritage of various members of the Hungarian diaspora. The four teams featured two current members of ConIFA, together with two other teams, with the winner qualifying for the World Football Cup.

World Unity Cup 2016
The World Unity Cup was planned as a four-team tournament held at the end of August 2016 in Sutton. The competition was organised jointly by three ConIFA members representing displaced peoples, with the winner qualifying for the World Football Cup.

 Ellan Vannin (not a displaced people)

Subsequent to the announcement, both Darfur and Ellan Vannin withdrew, and the tournament was reorganized as a three-team event, with the Barawa team replacing them.

ConIFA European Football Cup 2017
The 2017 European Football Cup was announced in January 2017 with a total of eight teams due to take part. The winner of the competition was guaranteed a place at the World Football Cup.

Group A

Group B

Knockout stages

Qualification points standing
The following is a list of games not part of sanctioned ConIFA tournaments for which teams have accrued qualifying points:

As of  :

:1. Teams that have already qualified no longer accrue qualification points

Wild Card
In May 2017, CONIFA announced on its website that five of its members had completed the necessary process to be considered for the WFC Wild Card place by the deadline of 2 May 2017. The wild card spot was decided at the CONIFA Executive Committee meeting, held during the European Football Cup in Northern Cyprus. The five teams under consideration were:

At the Executive Committee meeting, held in Northern Cyprus on 8 June 2017, Tibet were awarded the Wild Card place.

Top goalscorers
6 goals

  Panushanth Kulenthiran

5 goals

  Barna Bajko

4 goals

  Gurjit Singh

3 goals

  Gvinthan Navaneethakrishnan
  Sujan Sivanesamurthy
  On-Song Tae
  Sean Doyle
  Renàto Meszlènyi
  Ertaç Taşkıran
  Halil Turan
  Andrea Rota

2 goals

  J. Sufi
  Vahagn Militosyan
  Terlochan Singh
  Rajpal Virk
  Guillaume Lafuente
  Mathieu Irigoyemboyde
  Mickael Bertini
  Furo Davies
  Ciaran McNulty
  Yuuki Gomi
  David Zoller
  Anatoli Semyonov
  Mustafa Yasinses
  İbrahim Çıdamlı
  Krisztián Mile
  William Rosset
  Norsaq Lund Mathæussen
  Mohamed Boglaida 

1 goal

  Grmawi Eyob
  Sandor Mindlecz
  Daniel Pozsár
  Norbert Könyves
  Zoltán Nagy
  László Szőcs
  Silion Petru
  Gabor Renczés
  Ádám Érsek
  Zoltan Magyar
  Kalmar Lajos
  Mèszàros David
  Nemeth Zoli
  Lajos Kalmar
  György Pragai
  Jozsef Katona
  David Meszaros
  Richard Krizan
  Johnath Chandran
  Ragvan Prashanth
  Prabashan
  Didier Gaspard
  Mervin Bhujan
  Hansley Robertson
  Diveeyen Sooprayen
  Aaron Minhas
  Karum Shanker
  Amar Purewal
  Rio Riaz
  Quentin Chalut Natal
  Boris Massarè
  Pierre Barremaecker
  Brice Martinez
  Frank Jones
  Ste Whitley
  Dan Simpson
  Sean Quaye
  Liam Cowin
  Chris Bass
  Lee Seong-Cheol
  Kang Awe
  Akimoto Kaijin
  Lee Yoshiaki
  Vladislav Klyuyev
  Valeriy Titarenko
  Serhan Önet
  Uğur Gök
  Dmitri Kortava 
  Ruslan Shoniya
  Alan Kadjaev
  Solsan Kochiev
  David Robert
  Ohar Roman
  Zoltan Baksa
  Kész Tibor
  Ersid Pllumbaj
  Niels Svane
  Nukannguaq Zeeb 
  Johan Bistrup
  Malik Juhl
  Hamid Mohammed
 Own Goal

References

CONIFA World Football Cup
International association football competitions hosted by Germany
International association football competitions hosted by Hungary
International association football competitions hosted by England
2015–16 in German football
2016–17 in Hungarian football
2016–17 in English football
2016 in association football